Han Army may refer to one of the following related to Han Chinese people:

 An army or military of any of several Han states dating from the 11th century BCE
 Han Army of Eight Banners, Han Chinese groups in the Ming Dynasty (1368–1644) who surrendered to or joined the Qing Dynasty
 Any army composed primarily of ethnic Han Chinese, from the 11th century BCE to current